Fortunato Abat  (June 10, 1925 – March 7, 2018) was a Filipino major general who served as the 20th Secretary of the Department of National Defense (DND), Ambassador to the People's Republic of China, and Commanding General of the Philippine Army.

Early years
Fortunato Abat was born on June 10 in San Juan, La Union.  He studied in Singalong Elementary School in the city of Manila from 1932 to 1939, then in Araullo High School, 1939–41.  His secondary education was abruptly halted by the Japanese invasion during World War II. As a young teenager, he entered the Philippine Army which was incorporated into the United States Armed Forces in the Far East (USAFFE) as an enlisted man on April 15, 1944, before the Allied Liberation of the Philippines. He continued his secondary education in La Union High School even after World War II and completed his education in the year 1947.

Military
Abat entered the Philippine Military Academy right after finishing his high school diploma, and graduated in the Class of '51, and was commissioned as 2nd Lieutenant in the Philippine Army.  Along with 2nd Lieutenant Fidel V. Ramos, Abat joined the Philippine Expeditionary Forces to Korea (PEFTOK), where he served with distinction under the United Nations flag.

Abat's colorful military career brought him to become the Assistant Chief of Staff for Operations & Training of the 1st Infantry (Tabak) Division.  Later on he became the Senior Armed Forces Attache at the Philippine Embassy in Phnom Penh, Cambodia.  He also was sent with the Philippine Delegation to the 1st, 2nd, 3rd, 4th, and 5th Meetings of SEATO Intelligence Assessment Committee in Bangkok, Thailand.

He also distinguished himself as Commanding Officer of the 3rd Infantry Brigade (Separate), and later on as the Commanding General of the 3rd Infantry Division, and Central Mindanao Command (CEMCOM).

Maj. Gen. Abat finally served as Commanding General of the Philippine Army from March 28, 1976, to March 28, 1981.  Tragedy befell the family of Maj. Gen. Abat, when his son, 2Lt. Tito B. Abat, died during an encounter with the New People's Army in Eastern Samar, a year after graduating from the Philippine Military Academy.

Immediately after his retirement from active military service, he joined the Ministry of Human Settlements. A few months later, he was named Ambassador to the People’s Republic of China where he served from May 1981 until after EDSA Revolution in April 1986.

Upon his return from his Ambassadorship in PROC, Abat was first appointed as the Administrator of the Philippine Veterans Affairs Office (PVAO), a DND agency. Later on, he was named Undersecretary of National Defense (USND) during the term of Defense Secretary Rafael Ileto. He also served as USND during the term of then Defense Secretary Fidel V. Ramos, but he left the department and was designated Deputy Director General to Secretary Rafael Ileto who later headed the National Security Council (NSC).

During the presidency of Fidel Ramos, Abat was the Chairman of the Peace Panel of the Philippine Government during the negotiations with the Moro National Liberation Front (MNLF), which led to signing of a peace treaty on July 18, 1997, ending the three decade old armed hostilities between the Republic of the Philippines and the MILF. He also served as the 20th Secretary of the Department of National Defense from September 16, 1997, to June 30, 1998.

During the height of the impeachment trial of President Joseph Estrada, Abat along with his colleagues in the Association of General and Flag Officers (AGFO) called for the resignation of the President through a Manifesto.

Abat finally was appointed as the President & CEO of the John Hay Poro Point Development Corp. by Pres. Gloria Macapagal Arroyo.

Later life
Despite in retirement, Abat has continued to play a role in Philippine politics, without escaping controversy.  Abat, who formed the National Coalition for Solidarity (NCS) and the Movement for National Salvation (MVS) called on for the resignation of President Gloria Macapagal Arroyo.

In December 2005, Abat was arrested after he called on the formation of a revolutionary government, of which he is the new President of the Philippines, and called on the resignation of Pres. Gloria Macapagal Arroyo in view of the latter's allegations of corruption.

On August 15, 2006, Abat called for the abolishment of the Philippine Government and the Philippine Constitution, and the creation of a "Transition Government" of "Discipline and Authoritative Governance" where "All the three (3) branches of government are collectively responsible and accountable to the President that has oversight power over the discharge of their functions and responsibilities. Focus of governance. Governance is focused on the civil service and the military and police service."

Awards and distinctions
  Distinguished Conduct Star
  Distinguished Service Star (3)
  Presidential Golden Heart Award
  Commander of the Philippine Legion of Honor
  Outstanding Achievement Medal
  Philippine Liberation Medal
  Philippine Republic Presidential Unit Citation
  Military Merit Medal
  Long Service Medal
  Korean Service Medal
  Anti-Dissidence Campaign Medal
  Luzon Anti-Dissidence Campaign Medal
  Mindanao Anti-Dissidence Campaign Medal
  Combat Commander's (Kagitingan) Badge
  United Nations Service Medal
  Commander of the Royal Order of Monisaraphon (Cambodia)
 Kartika Eksa Paksi Medal & Sword of Indonesia (Degree of Cmdr)
  Cheon-Su Medal of the Order of National Security Merit (Korea)
  Presidential Unit Citation (Korea)
  Knight Grand Cross (First Class) of the Most Noble Order of the Crown of Thailand
  Commander of the Legion of Merit (United States)
 US Congressional Gold Medal for Filipino Veterans of World War II (posthumous; 2022)

See also
Armed Forces of the Philippines

References

External links
20th DND Secretary
Emails from Maj. Gen. Fortunato Abat

|-

1925 births
2018 deaths
Secretaries of National Defense of the Philippines
Philippine Military Academy alumni
Philippine Army generals
Filipino military personnel of the Korean War
Filipino military personnel of World War II
People from La Union
Commanders of the Legion of Merit
Recipients of the Distinguished Conduct Star
Recipients of the Philippine Legion of Honor
Recipients of the Outstanding Achievement Medal
Recipients of the Military Merit Medal (Philippines)
Recipients of the Distinguished Service Star
Order of National Security Merit members
People's Reform Party politicians
Ramos administration cabinet members
Burials at the Libingan ng mga Bayani
Members of the Royal Order of Monisaraphon